Eurocentral is one of the largest industrial estates in Scotland, situated on the edge of Holytown and Mossend, North Lanarkshire, just off the M8 motorway, about  east of Glasgow city centre and  west of Edinburgh. The nearest communities to the estate are Holytown, Mossend, Chapelhall, Calderbank and Carnbroe. The closest major towns are Bellshill , Motherwell , Coatbridge  and Airdrie .

There is a bus link to and from Glasgow city centre and Livingston, West Lothian. Eurocentral has warehouse distribution centres, factories, call centres, a railfreight centre which links with Grangemouth docks  to the north east, England to the south and beyond to mainland Europe. The estate also has a large modern hotel/restaurant (Dakota). One of the landmarks of the Eurocentral are the so-called "Big Heids" which are three red upturned shipping containers with tubes making the shape of human heads.

The Maxim Office Park is a recent addition opening in March 2010. Built in a single phase, Maxim is also the UK’s largest speculatively built office park.

Eurocentral factory
Eurocentral was the name given to a former factory near Holytown operated by the Taiwanese television parts manufacturer Chunghwa Picture Tubes (中華映管). The building is sometimes referred to as The Chunghwa Factory, and is locally infamous because it was built using large amounts of taxpayers’ money but was demolished within 10 years. Originally designed as a factory to produce cathode ray tubes for use in television sets and monitors, the rapid rise in popularity of LCD and plasma televisions contributed to the huge losses made by the Chunghwa company. It is also reported that a huge water bill from West of Scotland Water also helped contribute to the eventual demise of the site. Opening in 1996 the factory was expected to create 3,000 local jobs. However employment never rose above 1,200 and the factory was empty by 2003. The company was forced to repay £8 million of the £20 million it received from the government. The factory was demolished and the site developed into a mixed use commercial and business park.

Maxim Park
The £330 million park is the UK’s largest speculative office park development, comprising 10 buildings, totalling  of high-quality space. The entire park was completed in March 2010. As well as Grade A office accommodation and a wide range of shops and leisure facilities the park also houses one of Scotland's largest nurseries, Papillon Nursery and one of the Dakota Hotels (although not part of the Maxim estate it is very close by and built in keeping with the park's image).

The park currently has a shuttle bus service provided by Castle Cars of Uddingston.

Current tenants include: The Linear UK Group, Proact IT, Papillon Nursery, SEPA, REGUS, Currie & Brown, Vaillant, Berits & Brown, ACS Clothing, Sitel and Sure Thing Insurance, a newly incorporated insurance intermediary.

In June 2014, planning permission was granted for the addition of a sports pavilion.

References

Sources
 "Chungwha Factory - The Parr Partnership, Eurocentral"
 "Chunghwa factory demolition starts"
 "Chunghwa plant sold in (pounds) 300m deal; Tritax deal to redevelop"

External links
Eurocentral website

Buildings and structures in South Lanarkshire
Economy of North Lanarkshire
Business parks of Scotland
Bellshill
Motherwell
Industrial parks in the United Kingdom